The Republic Of China participated in the 1954 Asian Games held in the capital city of Manila, Philippines. This country was ranked 6th with 2 gold medals, 4 silver medals and 7 bronze medals with a total of 4 medals to secure its spot in the medal tally.

Medalists

Medal summary

Medal table

References

Nations at the 1954 Asian Games
1954 in Taiwanese sport
Chinese Taipei at the Asian Games